Rachel York (born August 7, 1971) is an American actress and singer. She is known for stage roles in City of Angels, The Scarlet Pimpernel, Les Misérables, Victor/Victoria, Kiss Me, Kate, Sly Fox, Dirty Rotten Scoundrels and Anything Goes. She also has many film and television credits, including her portrayal of Lucille Ball in the CBS biographical film Lucy.

Career
At age 19, York approached talent agent Bill Timms. She performed monologues from Nuts and Sophie's Choice and gave him a demo tape with songs from Evita. Timms signed her immediately and described her as being able to "... do anything."

Theatre
York made her Broadway debut as Mallory in the musical City of Angels, and her performance won critical acclaim. After City of Angels, she has been in many performances on stage, including Fantine in Les Misérables, Irene St. Claire in Crucifer of Blood, The Younger Woman in Stephen Sondheim's Putting It Together (with Julie Andrews), which earned her a Drama Desk Award nomination, Norma Cassidy in Victor/Victoria (for which she won a Drama Desk Award), Marguerite in The Scarlet Pimpernel, Lili Vanessi/Katharine in Kiss Me, Kate, Reno Sweeney in Anything Goes, Dorothy in Summer of '42, Miss Fancy in Sly Fox, Ruth Sutton in Dessa Rose, earning her another nomination for a Drama Desk Award, Mother in Ragtime, Christine Colgate in Dirty Rotten Scoundrels, and in The Sound of Music as Elsa Shraeder at the Hollywood Bowl.
She appeared as Guenevere in the National Tour of Camelot in the 2006–2007 season, for which she earned the Golden Icon Award from Travolta Family Entertainment for Best Actress in a Touring Production as well as the Carbonell Award. 
In 2008, she played Dixie Wilson in Turn of the Century directed by Tommy Tune at the Goodman Theater in Chicago.
In 2009, she played Dolly Levi in the Reagle Music Theatre production of Hello, Dolly! in Waltham, Massachusetts and won an IRNE Award for her performance.

In 2010, York returned to the Reagle Music Theatre in its production of Into the Woods where she played the Witch and won another IRNE Award for the role. That same year she played the Lady of the Lake in the Ogunquit Playhouse production of Spamalot.

In 2011, she starred as Billie Burke in the musical Ghostlight Off-Broadway at the Signature Theatre. She then played Anna in the 2011 Walnut Street Theatre production of The King and I.

She starred in Encores! concert series production of Gentlemen Prefer Blondes as Dorothy Shaw, which earned her and the production rave reviews. The live concert lasted May 9–13, 2012 and was a New York Times Critic's Pick.

York played the role of Reno Sweeney in the national tour of the 2011 Roundabout Theatre Broadway revival of Anything Goes, which began October 2, 2012. For this role, she won the Helen Hayes Award for Outstanding Lead Actress in a Visiting Production. In February 2014, she played Young Belle in the Encores! concert of Little Me.

In May 2015, it was announced that York would appear in the musical Grey Gardens taking the role of Little Edie Bouvier Beale at Bay Street Theater in Sag Harbor, NY. She played the role of Morticia Addams in The Addams Family with 3D Theatricals later that year in Los Angeles.

She returned to Broadway in the musical Disaster!, which played from February to May 2016 at the Nederlander Theatre. York appeared alongside Seth Rudetsky, Adam Pascal, Kerry Butler, and Tony-nominated Jennifer Simard.

In July 2016, York and Betty Buckley, with whom she previously starred in Grey Gardens in New York, began a limited run of the production at the Ahmanson Theater in Los Angeles, CA. York went on to originate the role of Gynecia in the Broadway musical, Head Over Heels. She next appeared as Baroness Rodmilla de Ghent in Ever After The Musical. In October 2021, York once again played Reno Sweeney, this time in the London revival of Anything Goes at the Barbican Theatre, where she succeeded Sutton Foster in the role.

Film
Her film credits include One Fine Day, Billy Bathgate, Dead Center, Second Honeymoon, Terror Tract, Au Pair II, and the TV movie Lucy in which she played Lucille Ball. Her performance in the London production of Kiss Me, Kate is available on DVD/video. She also played Lori, The Mystery Woman in Sasha Gordon's highly praised film It Had To Be You.

Television
She also has many credits in television, including appearances on Reba, Frasier, Arli$$, Spin City, The Naked Truth, Diagnosis: Murder, and also provides the voices of Bitty on Higglytown Heroes and Circe on Justice League Unlimited. In 2008, she also guest starred on an episode of Hannah Montana, playing Isis on the episode Yet Another Side of Me. York filmed for the TV series Power in 2015 and is featured in Episode 7 "You're Not the Man" as Tina Schulman. She was also guest starred in Frasier as Dinah or "Officer Nasty" in the episode "To Thine Old Self Be True" (Season 7, Episode 20).

Singing
York released her debut album Let's Fall in Love in early 2005, produced by Tor Hyams under the HyLo Entertainment label and was exclusively distributed by Barnes and Noble. She can also be heard on the Cast recordings of City of Angels, Victor/Victoria, The Scarlet Pimpernel: Encore!, Dessa Rose, Putting It Together, Summer of '42, the soundtrack of Billy Bathgate, and recordings of Opal and Celebration of Life.

Personal life
She married actor Ayal Miodovnik on July 29, 2009. They have a daughter, Olivia.

Theater

Broadway
City of Angels (1989) – Mallory Kingsley
Les Misérables – Fantine
Victor/Victoria (1995) – Norma Cassidy
The Scarlet Pimpernel (1998) – Marguerite
Sly Fox (2004) – Miss Fancy
Dirty Rotten Scoundrels (2006) – Christine
Disaster! (2016) – Jackie
Head Over Heels (2018) – Gynecia

Off-Broadway
Dessa Rose (2005) – Ruth
Ghostlight (2011) – Billie Burke

West End/London
Kiss Me, Kate (2002) – Lilli Vanessi/Kate
Anything Goes (2021) - Reno Sweeney

National tours
Kiss Me, Kate (2001) – Lilli Vanessi/Kate
Camelot (2007) – Guenevere
101 Dalmatians Musical (2009) – Cruella de Vil
Anything Goes (2012) – Reno Sweeney

Regional Theater Credits
The Crucifer of Blood – Irene St. Claire
Putting It Together – The Younger Woman
Ragtime – Mother
Hello Dolly! – Mrs. Dolly Gallagher Levi
Into the Woods – The Witch
Spamalot – The Lady of the Lake
The King and I – Anna Leonowens
The Addams Family – Morticia Addams
Grey Gardens – Little Edie Bouvier Beale &  Edith Bouvier Beale
Ever After The Musical – Baroness Rodmilla de Ghent

Concerts
The Sound of Music – Elsa Schraeder 
Gentlemen Prefer Blondes – Dorothy Shaw
Little Me – Young Belle

Filmography

Film
Billy Bathgate – Embassy Club Singer
Mad Dog Coll (aka Killer Instinct) – Lotte
 Taking the Heat – Susan
Deadline – Marci Fenner
Dead Center – Mary
Second Honeymoon – Gloria
One Fine Day – Liza
Terror Tract – Sarah Freemont
Au Pair II – Cassandra Hausen
Cradle Swapping – Mrs. Burnett

Television
Kiss Me, Kate – Lili Vanessi/Katherine
Lucy: The Lucille Ball Story – Lucille Ball
The Courtship of Eddie's Father – Lisa
Justice League Unlimited – Circe
Diagnosis: Murder No. 96. (A Mime is a Terrible Thing to Waste) – Randy Wolfe
Hannah Montana – Isis
Frasier ("To Thine Old Self Be True" - Season 7, Episode 20) - Dinah aka Officer Nasty
Power – Tina Schulman
Elementary – Carla Giovanni
The Mick – Dr. Goodby

Video games
Neverwinter Nights 2 – Shandra Jerro

Recordings
 City of Angels – 1990 Original Broadway Cast Recording
 Putting It Together – 1993 Original Off-Broadway Cast Recording
 Victor/Victoria – 1995 Original Broadway Cast Recording
 The Scarlet Pimpernel: Encore! – 1998 Broadway Revival Cast Recording
 Dessa Rose – 2005 Original Lincoln Center Cast Recording
 Summer of '42 – Sept 2006, Original Cast Recording
 Disaster! – 2016 Original Broadway Cast Recording
 Opal, Honky Tonk Highway and Other Theatre Songs by Robert Nassif Lindsey
 Let's Fall in Love – Solo album released under HyLo Entertainment and produced by Tor Hyams

Awards

References

External links

BroadwayWorld.com interview with Rachel York, September 4, 2007

1971 births
Living people
American film actresses
American musical theatre actresses
American television actresses
American voice actresses
Drama Desk Award winners
Actresses from Orlando, Florida
20th-century American actresses
21st-century American actresses